Franz William "Dutch" Frurip (1883–1927) was an American college football player and coach. He served as the head football coach at Indiana State University in 1907. He was a standout player at Wabash College in Crawfordsville, Indiana, earning All-Western honors in 1906.

Head coaching record

References

External links
 

1883 births
1927 deaths
American football ends
Indiana State Sycamores football coaches
Wabash Little Giants football players